The Belgium men's national softball team is the softball team representing Belgium in international games and tournaments.

It is controlled by the Koninklijke Belgische Baseball- en Softbalbond (Royal Belgian Baseball- and Softball Federation) and participates in international tournaments of the supranational softball organisations ESF and ISF, like the European championship and the world championship. As of 2013, the team never attended world championships but did participate in 7 European championships.

World Championship

European Championship 

Red border colour indicates tournament was held on home soil.

External links 
 Official website KBBSF
 European Softball Federation
 International Softball Federation

Softball
Men's national softball teams
Men's sport in Belgium
Softball in Belgium